HMS Milfoil was a modified  that served in the Royal Navy and the United States Navy (as USS Intensity (PG-93)) before being transferred to Panama where she served as a whaling ship.

During most of World War II, she operated from New York on escort duty to the Caribbean Sea.  She completed 15 escort runs in this role.  As USS Intensity, she was designated an Action-class patrol gunboat and manned by the United States Coast Guard. She was put on patrol in New York for a month in 1944 but was later returned to escort duty in the Caribbean.

After the threat from German attack disappeared in May 1945, USS Intensity sailed to Charleston, South Carolina, arriving on 29 June 1945.  She was decommissioned later that year in Charleston and put into the trust of the United States Maritime Commission.

In 1950, she was sold to a Panamanian company, Balleneros Ltd., where she was used as a whaling ship called Olympic Promoter.  She was then sold to a Japanese company and renamed Otori Maru № 5.

The ship was scrapped at Shodoshima on 1 April 1966.

References

 USN Ships--USS Intensity (PG-93)
 uboat.net: Corvette of the Flower (rev.) class
 Gunboat PG-93 Intensity on navsource.org
 PG-93 Intensity

Ships built in Belfast
Flower-class corvettes of the Royal Navy
Action-class gunboats
1942 ships